The Hierophant (V) is the fifth card of the Major Arcana in occult Tarot decks. It is derived from the historical card known as the Pope in playing card decks. It is used in divination.

Description and symbolism
In many modern packs, the Hierophant is represented with his right hand raised in blessing or benediction, with two fingers pointing skyward and two pointing down, thus forming a bridge between Heaven and Hell reminiscent of that formed by the body of The Hanged Man. The Hierophant is thus a true "pontiff", in that he is the builder of the bridge between deity and humanity.  In his left hand he held a triple cross. The Hierophant is typically male, even in decks that take a feminist view of the Tarot, such as the Motherpeace Tarot, The Hierophant was also known as "The Teacher of Wisdom".

In most iconographic depictions, the Hierophant is seen seated on a throne between two pillars symbolizing Law and Freedom or obedience and disobedience, according to different interpretations. He wears a triple crown, and the keys to Heaven are at his feet. Sometimes he is shown with worshippers, as his alternate title is the Pope or, sometimes, Jupiter. The card is also known as "The High Priest", as a counterpart to "The High Priestess" (which itself is also sometimes known as "The Papess", as counterpart to "The Pope").

History
The papacy was not just a religious force, but was a political and military force as well. When the tarot was invented, the Pope controlled a large portion of central Italy known as the Papal States. Renaissance culture did not question the abstract ideal of the Pope as God's human representative on Earth, but others involved in the religious Reformation of that Age would have disagreed. In Tarot of Marseilles, he wears a red cape and a blue robe, in contrast to The Papess, who wears a blue cape and red robe.

In occult circles, the more commonly encountered modern name "Hierophant"  is due to Antoine Court de Gébelin and was an attempt to dechristianise the standard French tarot pack, the Tarot de Marseilles, out of a mistaken belief of a pre-Christian origin. According to de Gébelin, "hierophant" was the title of the chief priest in the Eleusinian mysteries (an ancient Greek ritual). However, historical evidence shows that tarot cards were invented in Northern Italy in the first half of the 15th century and not in ancient Egypt.

Interpretation

According to A.E. Waite's 1910 book Pictorial Key to the Tarot, the Hierophant card carries several divinatory associations:

5. THE HIEROPHANT.--Marriage, alliance, captivity, servitude; by another account, mercy, and goodness; inspiration; the man to whom the Querent has recourse. Reversed: Society, good understanding, concord, over kindness, weakness.

In media
 In JoJo's Bizarre Adventure, the character Noriaki Kakyoin has a Stand named after The Hierophant, Hierophant Green.
 In the Adventure Time miniseries Stakes, one of the members of the Vampire King's court is named after The Hierophant.

References

External links 

 The History of the Hierophant (Pope) Card from The Hermitage.

Major Arcana